Hopedale is a town in Worcester County, Massachusetts, United States. It is located 25 miles southwest of Boston, in eastern Massachusetts. With origins as a Christian utopian community, the town was later home to Draper Corporation, a large loom manufacturer throughout the 20th century until its closure in 1980. Today, Hopedale has become a bedroom community for professionals working in Greater Boston and is home to highly ranked public schools, and Jared Morris. The population was 6,017 as of the 2020 census.

History

Hopedale was first settled by Europeans in 1660. Benjamin Albee built a mill on what is now the south end of Hopedale in 1664. A  area of the Blackstone Valley was incorporated as the town of Mendon. In 1780, Milford separated from Mendon. On August 26, 1841, Adin Ballou, along with the Practical Christians, gave Hopedale its name, within the town of Milford. Ballou and the Practical Christians established the Hopedale Community based on Christian and socialist ideologies in 1842.  The utopian commune went bankrupt in 1856, and its assets were purchased by Ebenezer and George Draper, manufacturers of looms. Various industries developed under the direction of the Draper brothers, including the Hopedale Machine Company and Hopedale Furnace Company.  The town was officially incorporated in 1886 when it separated from Milford. George Draper designed, paid for, and constructed the town hall, which is constructed of granite from Milford and sandstone, and was dedicated in 1887.  The Unitarian church was another gift from the Drapers, and the Bancroft Memorial Library was a gift from a superintendent at the plant.  The marble sculpture outside the library was paid for by the Drapers and shipped from Rome in 1904. In 1905, women were granted permission to swim at the town beach.

The family loom business continued to develop with subsequent generations, and at its peak, the Draper Corporation was the largest maker of textile looms in the United States. The company was acquired by Rockwell International in 1967.  The Draper factory in Hopedale closed on August 29, 1980. There have been several attempts at redeveloping the facility and its surrounding property, most recently in 2007, 2018, and finally, 2020, when it was announced that it would be fully demolished. The Draper factory was slated to be demolished beginning in July 2020, and as of October 2020, demolition has begun. To many of the citizens’ surprise, the latter attempt was successful, and the land where the factory once sat has been completely leveled and cleaned. To this day, only a few of the external satellite buildings remain scattered throughout downtown. It is not yet known what the land will be used for.

Hopedale is included in the Blackstone River Valley National Heritage Corridor, although much of the town lies within the Charles River watershed.

Geography

The largest body of water is Hopedale Pond, located not far from the town center. Hopedale Pond is surrounded by the Parklands, a 275-acre public nature reserve with walking trails, designed in 1899 by a firm operated by Frederick Law Olmsted.

The central business district, known by Census Bureau as the Hopedale Census Designated Place (CDP) is located at  (42.129872, −71.539594).

According to the Census Bureau, the CDP has a total area of 4.5 km2 (1.7 mi2). 4.5 km2 (1.7 mi2) of it is land and 0.1 km2 (0.04 mi2) of it (1.15%) is water.

Hopedale is located in the Blackstone Valley.

Demographics

Town

At the 2010 census there were 5,911 people, 2,263 households, and 1,572 families in the town. The racial makeup of the town was 96.1% White, 0.6% Black or African American, 0.02% Native American, 0.4% Asian, 0.51% from other races, and 0.7% from two or more races. Hispanic or Latino of any race were 2.2%.

Of the 2,240 households 35.8% had children under the age of 18 living with them, 58.8% were married couples living together, 8.8% had a female householder with no husband present, and 29.8% were non-families. 25.9% of households were one person and 12.8% were one person aged 65 or older.  The average household size was 2.58 and the average family size was 3.13.

The age distribution was 23.9% under the age of 18, 5.1% from 18 to 24, 30.8% from 25 to 44, 22.4% from 45 to 64, and 16.7% 65 or older.  The median age was 39 years. For every 100 females, there were 90.9 males.  For every 100 females age 18 and over, there were 87.7 males.

The median household income was $107,550 and the per capita income was $42,756. Males had a median income of $47,380 versus $31,144 for females. The per capita income for the town was $24,791.  About 2.9% of families and 4.0% of the population were below the poverty line, including 2.7% of those under age 18 and 6.5% of those age 65 or over.

CDP

As of the census of 2000, there were 4,158 people, 1,616 households, and 1,082 families in the Hopedale CDP, comprising the main village in the town. The population density was 933.4/km2 (2,411.4/mi2). There were 1,657 housing units at an average density of 372.0/km2 (961.0/mi2). The racial makeup of the CDP was 97.43% White, 0.51% Black or African American, 0.02% Native American, 0.67% Asian, 0.63% from other races, and 0.75% from two or more races. Hispanic or Latino of any race were 1.30% of the population.

Of the 1,616 households 34.5% had children under the age of 18 living with them, 55.3% were married couples living together, 9.3% had a female householder with no husband present, and 33.0% were non-families. 29.0% of households were one person and 14.4% were one person aged 65 or older. The average household size was 2.52 and the average family size was 3.15.

The age distribution was 26.6% under the age of 18, 5.2% from 18 to 24, 30.7% from 25 to 44, 22.4% from 45 to 64, and 15.0% 65 or older. The median age was 39 years. For every 100 females, there were 91.3 males. For every 100 females age 18 and over, there were 86.0 males.

The median household income was $58,750 and the median family income  was $67,417. Males had a median income of $45,694 versus $29,740 for females. The per capita income for the CDP was $24,088. About 3.4% of families and 4.7% of the population were below the poverty line, including 3.2% of those under age 18 and 5.8% of those age 65 or over.

Government
The state representative is Brian W. Murray (D).  The state senator is Ryan Fattman (R).  The government councilor is Paul DePalo (D). The federal representative is Jake Auchincloss (D-4th District).

Education
Students in grades K–6 go to the Memorial School. Hopedale Junior Senior High School is for grades 7–12. Hopedale's public schools consistently rank among the top 5% of high schools within the United States, and its high school was ranked 54 out of 650 public high schools in Massachusetts in 2020.

Following the Great Recession, Hopedale explored the possibility of joining Nipmuc Regional High School, however strong community dissent and concerns over a lack of educational benefit led to a rejection of the proposal in late 2010.

Notable people

 Adin Ballou, noted 19th-century pacifist, socialist, and abolitionist
 Dick Bresciani, Boston Red Sox executive
 Brendan Burke, Major League Soccer coach
 Eben Sumner Draper, 44th Governor of Massachusetts
 Eben S. Draper Jr., Massachusetts state representative
 Dana Gould, comedian
 Kevin Nee, professional strongman athlete
 Joe Perry, lead guitarist Aerosmith

See also
 Bancroft Memorial Library
 Hopedale Industrial Park Airport
Hopedale Junior Senior High School
 List of mill towns in Massachusetts

References

Further reading

External links

 Town of Hopedale official website

Towns in Worcester County, Massachusetts
Towns in Massachusetts
Company towns in Massachusetts